Sean M. Farrell is a United States Air Force major general who has served as the deputy commanding general of the Joint Special Operations Command since June 2021. He previously served as director of force structure, requirements, resources, and strategic assessments of the United States Special Operations Command.

References

 

Living people
Place of birth missing (living people)
Recipients of the Defense Superior Service Medal
Recipients of the Distinguished Flying Cross (United States)
Recipients of the Legion of Merit
United States Air Force generals
United States Air Force personnel of the War in Afghanistan (2001–2021)
Year of birth missing (living people)